Shiao is a surname. Notable people with the surname include:

Lora Shiao, American intelligence officer
Peter Shiao (born 1967), Chinese media entrepreneur, film producer, social activist, and commentator
Stephanie Shiao (born 1968), Taiwanese actress, model, singer, and writer

See also
Xiao (surname)